Moera, a suburb of the city of Lower Hutt in New Zealand, forms part of the urban area of greater Wellington.

Location
Located at the south-eastern end of the Hutt River, the suburb's name Moera is thought to be a simplification of Moe-i-te-ra, meaning "sleeping in the sun".

History
Prior to European settlement, the Moera area was part of a large tidal estuary at the mouth of the Awamutu and Waiwhetū Streams. The southern side of Waiwhetū Stream contained a number of Ngati Ira villages.

In 1843 William Trotter settled in the area and established a fruit garden and nursery. The 1855 Wairarapa earthquake raised the Hutt Valley from 1 to 2 metres, thus draining the swampy estuary.

The area remained farmland up until 1926 when the Petone Railway Workshops were moved to Moera and Government sponsored prefabricated workers housing, built by the Railways Department, were sold to families.

Influence

To house workers almost 600 kitset homes were built to a simple 5 room layout. The whole project was completed by May 1927. These provided a template for State housing developments in later years.

Many of the current houses are original Railways Department built prefabricated cottages dating from that era.

Features
Moera was home to the Hutt Park Raceway from the 1860s, until Harness and Greyhound racing ceased at the park in 2003, The 12 Hectare park area has since been established as a sports and recreation ground, including a 7 court indoor sports centre and indoor children's playground.

The park lies between the southern industrial area of Lower Hutt and the residential suburb of Moera and is bounded by the Waiwhetu Stream, Gracefield railway line and Randwick Road.

A number of neighbouring facilities, sites and properties are complementary to the park. These include private commercial properties between Seaview Road and the Waiwhetu Stream, the Seaview Urupa, and walkways that link to the Hutt River and Waiwhetu Stream.

Demographics

Moera had a population of 1,626 at the 2018 New Zealand census, an increase of 93 people (6.1%) since the 2013 census, and an increase of 18 people (1.1%) since the 2006 census. There were 645 households. There were 822 males and 807 females, giving a sex ratio of 1.02 males per female. The median age was 36.4 years (compared with 37.4 years nationally), with 312 people (19.2%) aged under 15 years, 345 (21.2%) aged 15 to 29, 789 (48.5%) aged 30 to 64, and 183 (11.3%) aged 65 or older.

Ethnicities were 50.0% European/Pākehā, 26.6% Māori, 15.7% Pacific peoples, 21.4% Asian, and 4.4% other ethnicities (totals add to more than 100% since people could identify with multiple ethnicities).

The proportion of people born overseas was 31.0%, compared with 27.1% nationally.

Although some people objected to giving their religion, 42.6% had no religion, 35.1% were Christian, 8.1% were Hindu, 2.2% were Muslim, 0.7% were Buddhist and 5.4% had other religions.

Of those at least 15 years old, 264 (20.1%) people had a bachelor or higher degree, and 297 (22.6%) people had no formal qualifications. The median income was $23,800, compared with $31,800 nationally. The employment status of those at least 15 was that 606 (46.1%) people were employed full-time, 180 (13.7%) were part-time, and 84 (6.4%) were unemployed.

Education

References

Suburbs of Lower Hutt
Populated places on Te Awa Kairangi / Hutt River